There are two rivers named Aquidabã River.

Brazil
 Aquidabã River (Mato Grosso do Sul)
 Aquidabã River (Paraná)

See also
 Aquidabán River, Paraguay
 Aquidaba (disambiguation)